Gazdan or Gezdan may refer to:
 Gazdan, Fars
 Gazdan-e Abbas Abdollah, Fars Province
 Gazdan, Bandar Lengeh, Hormozgan Province
 Gazdan, Jask, Hormozgan Province
 Gazdan, Bam, Kerman Province
 Gazdan, Shahr-e Babak, Kerman Province
 Gazdan, Kohgiluyeh and Boyer-Ahmad
 Gazdan, Sistan and Baluchestan